The 2019 Campeonato Paraibano de Futebol was the 109th edition of Paraíba's top professional football league. The competition began on 12 January and ended on 20 April. Botafogo-PB were defending champions, after defeating Campinense in the 2018 final.

Botafogo-PB were crowned champions, after a repeat of the 2018 final against Campinense.

Format
The competition was divided into a number of stages.

In the first (group) stage, the ten teams were divided into two groups of five. Each team played the five teams in the other group, home and away, for a total of ten games. The teams that finished first and second in each group qualified directly for the second (semi-final) stage. The teams that finished last in each group were relegated to the second division.

In the second (semi-final) stage, the winner of each group played the runner up of their group over two games, home and away. The group winner had home advantage in the second leg.

In the third (final) stage, the two winning teams from the second (semi-final) stage played over two legs, with the team with the best record in the competition so far playing the second leg at home.

Qualification
The two finalists qualified to participate in the 2020 Copa do Brasil and 2020 Copa do Nordeste. The two best placed teams (other than those already participating in a national league) qualified to participate in the 2020 Campeonato Brasileiro Série D.

Participating teams

First stage

Group A

Group B

Semi-finals
In the semi-final stage, the winner of each group played the runner up of their group over two games, home and away. The group winner had home advantage in the second leg.

Semi-finals were played between 31 March and 14 April 2019.

|}

Final
The final took place over two games, home and away, and the team with the best record in the competition had home advantage in the second leg.

The final took place on 17 and 20 April 2019.

|}

References

Paraíba
2019